The Minister of Education, Science and Research of Austria heads the Ministry of Education.

Ministers

First Republic

Second Republic

See also 
 Ministry of Education (Austria)

Notes

References 

Education